Park House English School is a private international English school in Doha, Qatar.
Park House English School was founded in Doha in 1994 by the Brennan family, and acquired by the International Schools Partnership in 2015.

School Council 
Heather Brennan remained the principal of the school until Dougie Smith took over. The current Principal, John Smith, took over in August 2017. The Head of Secondary is Mrs. Rebecca Saunders, the Head of Primary is Natasha Hilton and the Head of KS4 is Lyvica Allen

Accreditation

Park House English School is accredited by the following organizations:
BSME: British Schools of The Middle East
edexcel
British Schools Overseas
Park House English School also follows a Cambridge curriculum and is a part of the University Of Cambridge.

References

Educational institutions established in 1994
British international schools in Qatar
Cambridge schools in Qatar
1994 establishments in Qatar